Local H's Awesome Mix Tape #1 is an EP by the alternative rock band Local H. It was released on October 19, 2010 on the band's own G&P Records. The EP features covers that the band has performed live. The EP was released digitally, on CD as well as on a handful of cassette tapes.

Track listing

Personnel
Scott Lucas – guitar, vocals, bass
Brian St. Clair – drums

References

2010 EPs
Covers EPs
Local H EPs
Self-released EPs